Marion Baldur Sulzberger (12 May 1895 - 23 November 1983) was an American dermatologist known for major contributions in his discipline.

In 1928, 2 years after the Swiss dermatologist Bruno Bloch, he published a paper on a syndrome later on named Bloch-Sulzberger syndrome.

The pivotal paper of Sulzberger and Witten in 1952 on Compound F(later named hydrocortisone) introduced topical glucocorticoids into dermatology.

See also 
 List of dermatologists

References 

1895 births
1983 deaths
American dermatologists